GIS or Geographic Information Systems has been an important tool in archaeology since the early 1990s. Indeed, archaeologists were early adopters, users, and developers of GIS and GIScience, Geographic Information Science. The combination of GIS and archaeology has been considered a perfect match, since archaeology often involves the study of the spatial dimension of human behavior over time, and all archaeology carries a spatial component. 

Since archaeology looks at the unfolding of historical events through geography, time and culture, the results of archaeological studies are rich in spatial information. GIS is adept at processing these large volumes of data, especially that which is geographically referenced. It is a cost-effective, accurate and fast tool. The tools made available through GIS help in data collection, its storage and retrieval, its manipulation for customized circumstances and, finally, the display of the data so that it is visually comprehensible by the user. The most important aspect of GIS in archaeology lies, however, not in its use as a pure map-making tool, but in its capability to merge and analyse different types of data in order to create new information. The use of GIS in archaeology has changed not only the way archaeologists acquire and visualise data, but also the way in which archaeologists think about space itself. GIS has therefore become more of a science than an objective tool.

GIS in survey
Survey and documentation are important to preservation and archaeology, and GIS makes this research and fieldwork efficient and precise. Research done using GIS capabilities is used as a decision making tool to prevent loss of relevant information that could impact archaeological sites and studies. It is a significant tool that contributes to regional planning and for cultural resource management to protect resources that are valuable through the acquisition and maintenance of data about historical sites.

In archaeology, GIS increases the ability to map and record data when it is used directly at the excavation site. This allows for immediate access to the data collected for analysis and visualization as an isolated study or it can be incorporated with other relevant data sources to help understand the site and its findings better.

The ability of GIS to model and predict likely archaeological sites is used by companies that are involved with utilizing vast tracts of land resources like the Department of Transportation. Section 106 of the National Preservation Act specifically requires historical sites as well as others to be assessed for impact through federally funded projects. Using GIS to assess archaeological sites that may exist or be of importance can be identified through predictive modeling. These studies and results are then used by the management to make relevant decisions and plan for future development. GIS makes this process less time consuming and more precise.

There are different processes and GIS functionalities that are used in archaeological research. Intrasite spatial analysis or distributional analysis of the information on the site helps in understanding the formation, process of change and in documentation of the site. This leads to research, analysis and conclusions. The old methods utilized for this provide limited exposure to the site and provide only a small picture of patterns over broad spaces. Predictive modeling is used through data acquisition like that of hydrography and hypsography to develop models along with archaeological data for better analysis. Point data in GIS is used to focus on point locations and to analyze trends in data sets or to interpolate scattered points. Density mapping is done for the analysis of location trends and interpolation is done to aid surface findings through the creation of surfaces through point data and is used to find occupied levels in a site. Aerial data is more commonly used. It focuses on the landscape and the region and helps interpret archaeological sites in their context and settings. Aerial data is analyzed through predictive modeling which is used to predict location of sites and material in a region. It is based on the available knowledge, method of prediction and on the actual results. This is used primarily in cultural resource management.

GIS in analysis
GIS are able to store, manipulate and combine multiple data sets, making complex analyses of the landscape possible. Catchment analysis is the analysis of catchment areas, the region surrounding the site accessible with a given expenditure of time or effort.  Viewshed analysis is the study of what regions surrounding the site are visible from that site. This has been used to interpret the relationship of sites to their social landscape. Simulation is a simplified representation of reality, attempting to model phenomena by identifying key variables and their interactions. This is used to think through problem formulation, as a means of testing hypothetical predictions, and also as a means to generate data.

In recent years, it has become clear that archaeologists will only be able to harvest the full potential of GIS or any other spatial technology if they become aware of the specific pitfalls and potentials inherent in the archaeological data and research process. Archaeoinformation science attempts to uncover and explore spatial and temporal patterns and properties in archaeology. Research towards a uniquely archaeological approach to information processing produces quantitative methods and computer software specifically geared towards archaeological problem solving and understanding.

GIS in cultural heritage conservation and management
In addition to archaeological research applications, GIS is also used to help manage the conservation of cultural heritage sites. GIS helps conservation organizations monitor the impacts of development, conflict, and climate change on archaeological and other cultural resources. Some public agencies use GIS software to assess the potential impacts of construction and other development and use these assessments in permitting and mitigation processes.

See also
 Historical GIS

References

External links
 "Middle Eastern Geodatabase for Antiquities (MEGA) - Jordan (2007–2014)" – The Getty Conservation Institute-sponsored Middle Eastern Geodatabase for Antiquities (MEGA) is a Web-based GIS tool that enables the Jordanian Department of Antiquities to inventory, monitor, and manage the thousands of archaeological sites in Jordan.
 The Digital Archaeological Atlas of the Holy Land provides online access to site records and media related to the archaeology of Israel, Palestine, Jordan, the Sinai Peninsula and southern Lebanon.
 The Mediterranean Archaeological Network (MedArchNet) is constructing a series of linked archaeological atlases around the Mediterranean Basin.  The Digital Archaeological Atlas of the Holy Land is the first node.
 University of Alabama Office of Archaeology Research’s pages on using GIS
 Sensuous and Reflexive GIS: exploring visualisation and VRML in Internet Archaeology
 ESRI's page on using GIS in Archaeology
 Stanford Library's page on GIS and Archaeology
 ArchAtlas a project aims to provide a visual summary of spatial processes in prehistoric and early historic times, such as the spread of farming, the formation of trade contacts, and the growth of urban systems. 
 Historical Geographic Information Systems Online Forum on Google
 Fasti Online - an online GIS of archaeological sites
 Site Recorder, the GIS for maritime archaeology
 University of Edinburgh's One-Year Masters in GIS and Archaeology
 Arches (open-source cultural heritage data management and GIS software)

Methods in archaeology
Applications of geographic information systems
Historical geographic information systems